Per Brahe may refer to:

Count Per Brahe the Elder (1520–1590), Swedish statesman
Count Per Brahe the Younger (1602–1680), Swedish soldier and statesman
 The Swedish steamer ferry Per Brahe, wrecked in 1918 (see John Bauer (illustrator))